The 2018 West Java gubernatorial election took place on 27 June 2018 as part of the simultaneous local elections. It was held to elect the governor of West Java along with their deputy, whilst members of the provincial council (Dewan Perwakilan Rakyat Daerah) will be re-elected in 2019.

Incumbent Ahmad Heryawan was barred from participating in the re-elections after having served two full terms. Candidates included the sitting vice governor Deddy Mizwar, mayor of Bandung Ridwan Kamil, People's Representative Council member Tubagus Hasanuddin and retired major general Sudrajat.

Timeline
On 10 September 2017, the KPU declared that there will be 32,809,057 eligible voters in the province, down about 200 thousand from in 2013.

Registration for party-backed candidates were opened between 8 and 10 January 2018, while independent candidates were required to register between 22 and 26 November 2017. The numerical order of the candidates were determined on 13 February through a lottery. The campaigning period would commence between 15 February and 24 June, with a three-day election silence before voting on 27 June.

Candidates
Under regulations, candidates are required to secure the support of a political party or a coalition thereof comprising at least 20 seats in the regional house. Alternatively, independent candidates may run provided they are capable of securing support from 6.5 percent of the total voter population (2,132,470) in form of photocopied ID cards subject to verification by the local committee although no candidates expressing interest managed to do this.

Polling

After formal nominations

Before nominations

Results

Quick count

Official 

|- style="background-color:#E9E9E9"
! style="text-align:center" rowspan=2 |Candidate!! style="text-align:center;" colspan=2|Vote
|- style="background-color:#E9E9E9"
! style="text-align:center;" |Count !! style="text-align:center;" |%
|-
| style="text-align:left;" | Ridwan Kamil || 7,226,254 || 32.88
|-
| style="text-align:left;" | Tubagus Hasanuddin || 2,773,078 || 12.62
|-
| style="text-align:left;" | Sudrajat || 6,317,465 || 28.74
|-
| style="text-align:left;" | Deddy Mizwar || 5,663,198 || 25.77
|- style="font-weight:bold" class="sortbottom"
| style="text-align:left;" |Valid votes || 21,979,995 || 96.72
|- class="sortbottom"
| style="text-align:left;" |Invalid votes || 744,338 || 3.28
|- class="sortbottom"
| style="text-align:left;" |Total votes || 22,724,333 || 100.00
|- class="sortbottom"
| style="text-align:left;" |Registered electors || style="text-align:center;" colspan=2|32,325,315
|- class="sortbottom"
| colspan=3 style="text-align:left;" |Sources: Election Commission of West Java
|}

References

Elections in West Java
2018 Indonesian gubernatorial elections
West Java